Elías Már Ómarsson (born 18 January 1995) is an Icelandic professional footballer who plays as a forward for Dutch club NAC Breda and the Iceland national team.

Club career
Elías Már started his career with local club Keflavík in 2012. He signed a three-year contract with Vålerenga on 5 February 2015.

In 2016 he went out on loan to Swedish club IFK Göteborg for the second half of the season. He had a clause in the loan contract enabling IFK to buy Ómarsson for a set fee after the loan ended which IFK chose to use.

He moved to Eredivisie club Excelsior in August 2018.

On 18 January 2023, Elías Már agreed to return to the Netherlands on a 1.5-year contract with NAC Breda.

International career
Elías Már made his first appearance for the Iceland national team on 16 January 2015 in a match against Canada, when he came on as a substitute for Rúrik Gíslason with a few minutes left of the match.

Career statistics

Honours
Individual
 Eredivisie Player of the Month: May 2019

References

External links
 
 

1995 births
Living people
Elias Mar Omarsson
Association football forwards
Elias Mar Omarsson
Elias Mar Omarsson
Elias Mar Omarsson
Elias Mar Omarsson
Eliteserien players
Allsvenskan players
Eredivisie players
Eerste Divisie players
Ligue 2 players
Elias Mar Omarsson
Vålerenga Fotball players
IFK Göteborg players
Excelsior Rotterdam players
Nîmes Olympique players
NAC Breda players
Elias Mar Omarsson
Elias Mar Omarsson
Expatriate footballers in Norway
Elias Mar Omarsson
Expatriate footballers in Sweden
Elias Mar Omarsson
Expatriate footballers in the Netherlands
Elias Mar Omarsson
Expatriate footballers in France